Aquilegia viridiflora, commonly known as the green columbine or green-flowered columbine, is a species of flowering plant in the buttercup family. Its native range is southern Siberia to northern China, and Japan. It is an herbaceous perennial, and grows 15 cm to 50 cm tall, with a maximum spread of approximately 30 cm. Although it is grown as an ornamental, it may be considered a weed.

There are two named varieties:

 A. viridiflora var. atropurpurea (Willd.) Finet & Gagnep. (syn. A. atropurpurea Willd.; A. dahurica Patrin), which is native to China, Mongolia, and Siberia. It has purple flowers.
 A. viridiflora var. viridiflora, which is native to China, Japan, Mongolia, and Siberia. It has yellow-green flowers.

A. viridiflora 'Chocolate Soldier' is a cultivar with chocolate-brown flowers. It grows up to 30 cm tall.

Notes

References

Bibliography 

 

viridiflora